Daniel Doheny (born ) is a Canadian actor known for starring in the Canadian comedy film Adventures in Public School and the Netflix films Alex Strangelove, a coming-of-age story, and The Package, a raunchy comedy.

Early life and education
Doheny was born and raised in Vancouver, British Columbia, Canada, where he graduated from Lord Byng Secondary School in 2008. He then went on to attend Studio 58, a professional theatre training program at Langara College, where he graduated in 2012.

Career
In 2013, Doheny played six roles in Hamlet and Twelfth Night during the summer season of Bard on the Beach. He returned to the Bard stage in 2016 in The Merry Wives of Windsor.

Doheny is also part of the sketch comedy troupe HumanTown, who won the Canadian Broadcasting Corporation's ComedyCoup competition in 2014. As part of the prize, the troupe wrote, produced, and acted in a self-titled comedy special which aired on CBC Television in 2016.

Doheny won the Vancouver Film Critics Circle award for Best Actor in a Canadian Film at the Vancouver Film Critics Circle Awards 2021, for his performance in the film Drinkwater.

Filmography

Film

Television

References

External links

1990s births
Canadian male television actors
Canadian male film actors
Living people
Male actors from Vancouver
Writers from Vancouver
21st-century Canadian male actors
Langara College people